Maria Bentel (July 15, 1928 – November 8, 2000) was an American architect. She is known for her work as a founding partner of the architecture firm Bentel & Bentel Architects/Planners A.I.A.

Early life 

Maria Bentel, née Maria-Luise Ramona Azzarone, was born on June 15, 1928, in New York City to Maria Teresa ( Massaro) and Louis Azzarone, both of Italy. Bentel grew up in Jackson Heights, Queens. She attended Hunter College High School (at the time an all-girls school) and graduated in 1946. She was accepted to the Massachusetts Institute of Technology and completed the five-year bachelor of architecture program in 1951 as one of four females in her class. She studied with Alvar Aalto, Ralph Rapson, Pietro Belluschi and Laurence Anderson. After graduation, she received a Fulbright-Hays Scholarship for 1952-1953, which she spent attending the Istituto Universitario di Architettura di Venezia.

Education 
Maria Bentel earned a Bachelor of Architecture from MIT in 1951. She was a Fulbright scholar, Scuola d'Architettura, Venice, Italy (1952-53). In 1976, she became one of the first women to become a Fellow in the American Institute of Architects. And a year later she began teaching architecture at the New York Institute of Technology.

Career 
She was a lecturer at the City University of New York before becoming a teacher at the Architecture School of New York Institute of Technology.

Bentel & Bentel

Maria and her husband Frederick Bentel founded the architectural firm Bentel & Bentel in 1957.  its three principals are their sons Peter and Paul Bentel and Paul's wife Carol Rusche Bentel.

Personal life 
Maria moved to Boston to study architecture at Massachusetts Institute of Technology. She married her husband Frederick Bentel in 1952.

Awards 
Bentel & Bentel received 13 awards in design in architecture from organizations such as The AIA National Chapter and Archi Awards before her death in 2000. Since her death, Bentel & Bentel has gone on to win 86 more awards for their accomplishments.

Death
Maria Bentel died on November 8, 2000 at her home in Locust Valley from complications of bone marrow cancer. She was 72.

References

1928 births
2000 deaths
American women architects
Deaths from multiple myeloma
Deaths from cancer in New York (state)
20th-century American women
American people of Italian descent
Hunter College High School alumni
People from Jackson Heights, Queens
MIT School of Architecture and Planning alumni